The Fiji Senior League, or the Digicel Senior League for sponsorship reasons, is the second-highest division within the Fiji football league system after the Fiji Premier League. It is contested by twelve teams with two groups of six teams and is run and overseen by the Fiji Football Association in Fiji.

The champions of the Fiji Senior League are promoted to the Premier League with the other promotion coming from the play-offs. The league starts in February / March. The senior league is popular to "blood" the Fiji youth players to prepare them for professional football.

Current clubs

Viti Levu Zone
 Nadroga F.C.
 Tavua F.C.
 Tailevu North F.C.
 Rakiraki F.C.
 Tailevu Naitasiri F.C.

Vanua Levu Zone
 Bua FC
 Dreketi FC
 Nadogo FC
 Seaqaqa FC
 Savusavu FC
 Taveuni FC

Previous winners

Viti Levu Zone
 2019: Navua F.C. - Promoted to 2020 Fiji Premier League
 2020: Nadroga F.C.

Vanua Levu Zone
 2016: Bua F.C.
 2019: Savusavu F.C.
 2020: Bua F.C.

References 

Football leagues in Fiji